Dolní Chabry is a suburb of Prague in the Czech Republic. There are eight Menhirs located within this suburb, as well as a 12th-century Romanesque church.

External links 
  Official website

Districts of Prague